Dazzle camouflage of warships was adopted by the U.S. Navy during World War II, following research at the Naval Research Laboratory. Dazzle consists in painting obtrusive patterns on vertical surfaces. Unlike some other forms of camouflage, dazzle works not by offering concealment but by making it difficult to estimate a target's range, speed and heading. Each ship's dazzle pattern was unique to make it more difficult for the enemy to recognize different classes of ships. The result was that a profusion of dazzle schemes were tried, and the evidence for their success was at best mixed.

Dazzle camouflage patterns used on cruisers are presented here. Patterns designed for cruisers were suffixed with the letter C, but many cruisers were painted in adapted patterns originally designed for other ship types (A for aircraft carriers, D for destroyers etc.)

Colors

Some patterns were designed to be used for either Measure 31, 32 or 33 depending on the colors used; these pattern sheets were marked, e.g., MS-3_/3D; in the following table the effective Measure is listed in parentheses after each ship in the last column.  In addition, many ships were painted using colors for a different Measure than that marked on the sheet; these are indicated in footnotes.

Patterns

See also
World War II ship camouflage measures of the United States Navy
World War II US Navy dazzle camouflage measures 31, 32 and 33: aircraft carriers
World War II US Navy dazzle camouflage measures 31, 32 and 33: battleships
World War II US Navy dazzle camouflage measures 31, 32 and 33: destroyers

References

World War II ships of the United States
Vehicle markings
Camouflage
Military camouflage
Camouflage patterns